Benigno Bossi (1727–1792) was an Italian engraver, painter, and stucco artist.

Life
He was born at Arcisate near Milan. He was intended to have studied painting under Pompeo Batoni, but that artist's death prevented it, and he was advised by Anton Raphael Mengs and Dietrich to apply himself to engraving. He stayed for a time in Nuremberg and Dresden, but during the Seven Years' War he had to leave Saxony, and went in 1760 to Parma where he found patronage by the duke.

He died in Parma on 4 November 1792. Some sources appear to misspell his name as Benigno Rossi.

Prints
He engraved the following prints:

 Self-portrait.
 A Presentation in the Temple (1755).
 Forty small etchings of Heads, and other subjects.
 A Mascarade à la Grecque and a Suite des Vases after Ennemond Alexandre Petitot.
 Four of Trophies  (1771).
 Four of the Attributes of the Seasons (1770).
 Two of children.
 Allegorical figures representing the Towns in Piedmont.
 A set of 29 plates after the drawings of Parmigianino.

References

Bibliography 

1727 births
1792 deaths
18th-century Italian painters
Italian male painters
19th-century Italian painters
Italian painters of animals
Painters from Milan
19th-century Italian male artists
18th-century Italian male artists